Lin County or Linxian may refer to the following places in China:

Linzhou, Henan, formerly Lin County (林县), of Anyang, Henan
Lin County, Shanxi (临县), of Lüliang, Shanxi

See also 
 Linn County